Provincial elections were held in Sindh province of Pakistan in 1953. The elections, were first attempt at participatory democracy for the young nation, which received its independence six years earlier. It was neither free nor fair.

The election took place in May after several instances of rescheduling and suffered from the same voting irregularities that other states experienced in the 1951 provincial elections. Just five years later, President Iskander Mirza suspended elections, declared martial law, and seized power for twenty days until General Ayub Khan overthrew him in the 1958 coup d'état, the country's first military coup d'état.

References

1953 elections in Pakistan
1953